Justin Reid-Ross (born 16 July 1986) is a retired South African field hockey player who played as a defender for the South African national team.

At the 2012 Summer Olympics, he competed for the national team in the men's tournament. He played a total of 97 caps for the national team from 2006 to 2014.

Club career
Reid-Ross came to the Netherlands in 2010 to play for Pinoké. After four seasons he left Pinoké for Amsterdam. In the 2014–15 season he became the top scorer in the Dutch Hoofdklasse. He also played for the Ranchi Rhinos, the Ranchi Rays and the Delhi Waveriders in the Hockey India League from 2013 to 2017. In 2020 he had to leave Amsterdam and he went to Hurley. After one season at Hurley he retired as a hockey player.

References

External links

1986 births
Living people
South African male field hockey players
Male field hockey defenders
Field hockey players at the 2006 Commonwealth Games
2006 Men's Hockey World Cup players
2010 Men's Hockey World Cup players
Field hockey players at the 2012 Summer Olympics
2014 Men's Hockey World Cup players
Commonwealth Games competitors for South Africa
Olympic field hockey players of South Africa
People from Stellenbosch
Amsterdamsche Hockey & Bandy Club players
South African expatriates in the Netherlands
Hockey India League players
Men's Hoofdklasse Hockey players
Sportspeople from the Western Cape